Braddyville is a city in Page County, Iowa, United States. The population was 147 at the 2020 census.

History
Braddyville was laid out in the 1870s as a depot on the Chicago, Burlington and Quincy Railroad. It was named for its founder, James Braddy.

Geography
Braddyville's longitude and latitude coordinates in decimal form are 40.578722, -95.029816. The city is located on the Iowa-Missouri state line, along the Nodaway River.

Demographics

2010 census
As of the census of 2010, there were 159 people, 75 households, and 45 families living in the city. The racial makeup of the city was 98.1% White and 1.9% from two or more races. Hispanic or Latino of any race were 2.5% of the population.

There were 75 households, of which 24.0% had children under the age of 18 living with them, 46.7% were married couples living together, 5.3% had a female householder with no husband present, 8.0% had a male householder with no wife present, and 40.0% were non-families. 34.7% of all households were made up of individuals, and 13.3% had someone living alone who was 65 years of age or older. The average household size was 2.12 and the average family size was 2.71.

The median age in the city was 50.5 years. 19.5% of residents were under the age of 18; 5.7% were between the ages of 18 and 24; 17.6% were from 25 to 44; 35.3% were from 45 to 64; and 22% were 65 years of age or older. The gender makeup of the city was 55.3% male and 44.7% female.

2000 census
As of the census of 2000, there were 176 people, 75 households, and 53 families living in the city. The racial makeup of the city was 99.43% White and 0.57% Asian.

There were 75 households, out of which 41.3% had children under the age of 18 living with them, 53.3% were married couples living together, 13.3% had a female householder with no husband present, and 29.3% were non-families. 24.0% of all households were made up of individuals, and 9.3% had someone living alone who was 65 years of age or older. The average household size was 2.35 and the average family size was 2.77.

27.3% were under the age of 18, 7.4% from 18 to 24, 24.4% from 25 to 44, 25.0% from 45 to 64, and 15.9% who were 65 years of age or older. The median age was 39 years. For every 100 females, there were 104.7 males. For every 100 females age 18 and over, there were 96.9 males.

The median income for a household in the city was $37,917, and the median income for a family was $44,000. Males had a median income of $26,944 versus $32,188 for females. The per capita income for the city was $18,421. 4.9% of the population and 4.3% of families were below the poverty line. Out of the total population, none of those under the age of 18 and 8.7% of those 65 and older were living below the poverty line.

Education
Braddyville is served by the South Page Community Schools.

References

External links

 

Cities in Iowa
Cities in Page County, Iowa